The Kelham Island Brewery was a small independent brewery based in the  Kelham Island Quarter area of Sheffield, South Yorkshire, England. It closed down in May 2022.

In 1990 the brewery was opened (the first for 100 years to open in Sheffield) on purpose-built premises on Alma Street by the owner of the Fat Cat public house, Dave Wickett.  As well as the Fat Cat, the brewery owns a British-styled pub in Rochester, New York (United States), named the Old Toad.

Its beer Pale Rider won the "Champion Beer of Britain" award at the 2004 Campaign for Real Ale (CAMRA) organised Great British Beer Festival. 
 
The brewery is situated next to the Kelham Island Industrial Museum.

See also
 List of breweries in England

References

External links
Kelham Island Brewery
The Fat Cat
The Devonshire Cat

Buildings and structures in Sheffield
Beer and breweries in Sheffield
Manufacturing companies based in Sheffield
1990 establishments in England
British companies established in 1990
Food and drink companies established in 1990